The Derby Trailblazers are an English semi-professional basketball club based in Derby, Derbyshire. The club was founded in 2000 as a feeder club for the now-defunct Derby Storm, and wear the same blue and white colours as their predecessor. The Trailblazers currently compete in NBL Division 1, the second tier of the British basketball system.

History
The Trailblazers were founded in 2000 to give local players access to competitive women's and junior basketball teams after the city's professional outfit, Derby Storm, ended their equivalent programmes to focus on their professional team, which was then competing in the British Basketball League.  After the Storm withdrew in 2002, the Trailblazers added men's basketball to their offering, and started to gradually work their way up the English Basketball League.  Only a few years after entering the National League, the Trailblazers were crowned NBL Division Two champions in 2007, and were promoted to Division One for the 2007-08 season.

The team were successful in the second tier of British basketball, with the Trailblazers crowned Division One champions in 2010, and winning the National Trophy in 2012, beating Bristol Academy Flyers 87-60 in the final.  This success was hard to sustain though, with the team winning only six league games in the 2012-13 season, and suffering relegation back to Division Two as a result.  The Trailblazers won promotion back to Division One at the first attempt as Division Two champions with a game to spare.

Honours
Division 1 League Champions (1): 2009-10
Division 2 League Champions (2): 2006-07, 2013-14
Division 2 Playoff Champions (1): 2013-14
National Trophy Champions (1): 2011-12
Division 3 Playoff Champions (1): 2004-05
Division 3 North League Champions (1): 2004-05

Players

Current squad

Notable former players

  David Attewell

Season-by-season records

Record in BBL competitions

Honours
Division 1 League Champions (1): 2009-10
Division 2 League Champions (2): 2006-07, 2013-14
Division 2 Playoff Champions (1): 2013-14
National Trophy Champions (1): 2011-12
Division 3 Playoff Champions (1): 2004-05
Division 3 North League Champions (1): 2004-05

See also
Derby Storm

External links
Official Derby Trailblazers website
Derby Trailblazers Basketball Academy website
Derby Wheelblazers Basketball Club website

References

Basketball teams in England
Sport in Derby
2000 establishments in England
Basketball teams established in 2000